Poly(ADP-ribose) glycohydrolase is an enzyme. This enzyme catalyses the following chemical reaction

 hydrolyses poly(ADP-ribose) at glycosidic (1''-2') linkage of ribose-ribose bond to produce free ADP-ribose

Specific to (1''-2') linkage of ribose-ribose bond of poly(ADP-ribose).

References

External links 
 

EC 3.2.1